Numa T. Delouche (October 10, 1888  – July 7, 1965), was a Democrat from Cloutierville in south Natchitoches Parish,  who served in the Louisiana House of Representatives for one term between 1944 and 1948, along with Sylvan Friedman of nearby Natchez, Louisiana.

Delouche was married to Mary Vercher (1903–1979); their child, Numalee Pauline Delouche (1928–1934) died at the age of six. The Delouches are interred at St. John the Baptist Catholic Church Cemetery in Cloutierville.

References

 

1888 births
1965 deaths
People from Natchitoches Parish, Louisiana
Democratic Party members of the Louisiana House of Representatives
20th-century American politicians
Catholics from Louisiana